Slow cinema is a genre of art cinema characterised by a style that is minimalist, observational, and with little or no narrative, and which typically emphasizes long takes. It is sometimes called "contemplative cinema".

History
Founders of the genre include Andrei Tarkovsky, Ingmar Bergman, Michelangelo Antonioni, Robert Bresson, František Vláčil, Pier Paolo Pasolini, G. Aravindan, Aleksandr Sokurov, Béla Tarr, Chantal Akerman, Theo Angelopoulos, Abbas Kiarostami, Franco Piavoli. and Andy Warhol. Tarkovsky said, "I think that what a person normally goes to cinema for is time".

Greek director Theo Angelopoulos has been called an "icon of the so-called Slow Cinema movement".  Examples of the style include Ben Rivers's Two Years at Sea, Michelangelo Frammartino's Le Quattro Volte, and Shaun Wilson's 51 Paintings.

Recent underground film movements such as Remodernist film share the sensibility of slow or contemplative cinema. 

G. Aravindan was a filmmaker whose works such as Kanchana Sita, Thampu and Esthappan have been regarded as embodying a uniquely original style of contemplative cinema where the aesthetic sensibility and philosophical insights of Indian culture could find a meditative mode of expression within more universal contexts of humanism and transcendentalism. 

The AV Festival held a Slow Cinema Weekend at the Star and Shadow Cinema in Newcastle in March 2012, including the films of Rivers, Lav Diaz, Lisandro Alonso and Fred Kelemen.

Recent examples include films by Kelly Reichardt, Bruno Dumont, Albert Serra, Lech Majewski, Benedek Fliegauf, Apichatpong Weerasethakul, Anocha Suwichakornpong, Vimukthi Jayasundara, Hou Hsiao-hsien, Tsai Ming-Liang, Lav Diaz, Sergei Loznitsa, Carlos Reygadas, Amat Escalante, Nicolas Pereda, Nuri Bilge Ceylan, Sharunas Bartas, Pedro Costa, Paz Encina, and Scott Barley.

Notable slow films
A Man Escaped (1956)
Pickpocket (1959)
L'Eclisse (1962)
Red Desert (1964)
Au Hasard Balthazar (1966)
Mouchette (1967)
Marketa Lazarová (1967)
The Valley of the Bees (1968)
Solaris (1972)
Jeanne Dielman, 23, quai du Commerce, 1080 Bruxelles (1975)
Mirror (1975)
Stalker (1979)
The Lonely Voice of Man (1987)
Sátántangó (1994)
The House (1997)
Taste of Cherry (1997)
Eternity and a Day (1998)
In Vanda's Room (2000)
Werckmeister Harmonies (2000)
Goodbye Dragon Inn (2003)
Evolution of a Filipino Family (2004)
The Death of Mr. Lazarescu (2005)
Man Push Cart (2005)
Colossal Youth (2006)
Heremias (2006)
Syndromes and a Century (2006)
Wendy and Lucy (2008)
Alamar (2009)
Police, Adjective (2009)
Putty Hill (2010)
Le Quattro Volte (2010)
Somewhere (2010)
Once Upon a Time in Anatolia (2011)
The Turin Horse (2011)
Uncle Boonmee Who Can Recall His Past Lives (2011)
Museum Hours (2012)
Neighboring Sounds (2012)
Post Tenebras Lux (2012)
Norte, the End of History (2013)
Stray Dogs (2013)
Court (2014)
Horse Money (2014)
Corn Island (2014)
Cemetery of Splendour (2015)
Manakamana (2015)
Still the Earth Moves (2017)
An Elephant Sitting Still (2018)
Days (2020)
Memoria (2021)
Eami (2022)

Reception
Sight & Sound noted of the definition of slow cinema that "The length of a shot, on which much of the debate revolves, is a quite abstract measure if divorced from what takes place within it". The Guardian contrasted the long takes of the genre with the two-second average shot length in Hollywood action movies, and noted that "they opt for ambient noises or field recordings rather than bombastic sound design, embrace subdued visual schemes that require the viewer's eye to do more work, and evoke a sense of mystery that springs from the landscapes and local customs they depict more than it does from generic convention." The genre has been described as an "act of organized resistance" similar to the Slow food movement.

Criticism
Slow cinema has been criticized as indifferent or even hostile to audiences. A backlash by Sight & Sound's Nick James, and picked up by online writers, argued that early uses of long takes were "adventurous provocations created by extremists", whereas recent films are "operating within a recognized, default artistic idiom." The Guardian'''s film blog concluded that "being less overweeningly precious about films that are likely to be impenetrable to even the most well-informed audiences would seem an idea." Dan Fox of Frieze criticized both the dichotomy of the argument into "philistine" vs "pretentious" and the reductiveness of the term "slow cinema".

The American director Paul Schrader wrote about slow cinema in his 1972 book Transcendental Style in Film: Ozu, Bresson, Dreyer'', and called it an aesthetic tool. He argues that most viewers find slow cinema boring, but that a "slow film director keeps his viewer on the hook, thinking there's a reward, a payoff just around the corner."

Controversy
Recently, film scholars Katherine Fusco and Nicole Seymour have written that the slow cinema movement's supporters and detractors have both mischaracterized it. As they argue, much "commentary posits slow cinema as a kind of pastoral for the present moment, a respite from our technologically saturated ... Hollywood-blockbuster-centered era." Such commentary therefore associates the movement with pleasure and relaxation. But in reality, slow cinema films often focus on down-and-out laborers; as Fusco and Seymour argue, "for those on the fringes of society, modernity is actually experienced as slowness, and usually to their great detriment."

See also
 Dogme 95
 List of longest films
 Slow food and the Slow movement
 Art film
 Slow cutting
 Slow television
 Structural film
 Extreme cinema
 Still image film
 Non-narrative film
 Experimental film
 Shutter speed
 American Eccentric Cinema
 Minimalist film
 Modernist film
 Postmodernist film
 Working class culture
 Indiewood

References

Film genres
Avant-garde and experimental films
Cinema
Minimalism
Film and video terminology
1950s in film
1960s in film
1970s in film
1990s in film
2000s in film
2010s in film
2020s in film